Norwood is a village in East Feliciana Parish, Louisiana, United States. The population was 322 at the 2010 census. It is part of the Baton Rouge Metropolitan Statistical Area.

Geography
Norwood is located in northwestern East Feliciana Parish at  (30.969430, -91.105509). Louisiana Highway 19 passes through the village, leading south  to Baton Rouge and north  to the Mississippi border.

Demographics

As of the 2020 United States census, there were 279 people, 127 households, and 71 families residing in the village.

Notable people
 Lawrence Brooks (1909-2022), the oldest American veteran of World War II, was born in Norwood.

References

Villages in Louisiana
Villages in East Feliciana Parish, Louisiana
Villages in Baton Rouge metropolitan area